Frank Hammerschlag (born 28 September 1960) is a German football manager and former player.

Playing career
Coming from the youth of Bayer 05 Uerdingen, the defender began his football career at 1. FC Viersen in the Oberliga Nordrhein , before moving to league rivals 1. FC Bocholt in 1982 . There he was Niederrhein Cup winner and took part in the German amateur championship as a runner-up in the league . In the summer of 1983 he switched to professional football for MSV Duisburg . In the Duisburg relegation season 1985/86 , he joined the league rivals Tennis Borussia Berlin before the winter break , with whom he also occupied a relegation place. He then moved to SC Fortuna Köln. Between 1983 and 1987, Frank Hammerschlag played a total of 118 games in the 2nd Bundesliga and scored seven goals. After returning to the amateur camp, he played for the Rheydter Spielverein , with whom he was again runner-up in the upper league in 1990 and reached the final at the German amateur championship . In 1994 he also took over as coach at Rheydter SV.

Hammerschlag made 118 appearances in the 2. Bundesliga for MSV Duisburg, Tennis Borussia Berlin and SC Fortuna Köln. After finishing his playing career at Rheydter SV, he was the club manager from 1994 until 1996.

References

External links
 

1960 births
Living people
German footballers
Association football defenders
2. Bundesliga players
KFC Uerdingen 05 players
MSV Duisburg players
Tennis Borussia Berlin players
SC Fortuna Köln players
1. FC Bocholt players
German football managers